Tirumala is a spiritual town in Tirupati district of the Indian state of Andhra Pradesh. It is one of the suburbs of the Tirupati urban agglomeration. The town is a part of Tirupati Urban Development Authority and located in Tirupati (urban) mandal of Tirupati revenue division. It is a hill town where Tirumala Venkateswara Temple is located, which is the abode of Vishnu. The town is strictly vegetarian.

Geography
Surrounding the hills are seven peaks of Seshachalam range, Eastern Ghats namely Seshadri, Neeladri, Garudadri, Anjanadri, Vrushabadri, Narayanadri and Venkatadri. The temple of Sri Venkateswara is on the seventh peak (Venkatadri).

At the  point on the Tirupati – Tirumala Ghat road, there is a major discontinuity of stratigraphic significance that represents a period of remarkable serenity in the geological history of the Earth. This is referred to as the Eparchaean Unconformity. This unconformity separates the Nagari Quartzite of the Proterozoic from the granite of the Archean, representing a time gap of 800 Mya. In 2001, the Geological Survey of India (GSI) declared the Eparchaean Unconformity to be one of the 26 "Geological Monuments of India".

The arch measures  in width and  metres in height and is eroded out of quartizite of Cuddapah Supergroup of Middle to Upper Proterozoic (1600 to 570 Mya) by weathering agents such as water and wind.

Climate 

Tirumala has a tropical wet and dry climate designated Aw under the Köppen climate classification. As the hill shrine is situated amidst the hills, the temperature will go below 10 degrees in winter. Summers are not as hot here, especially compared to Tirupati. The southwest monsoon season starts from June, but rains are not heavy. Occasionally, thunderstorms form and downpours may persist for hours. Pertaining to orographic relief, the northeast monsoon remains active over the region for 2 months. It causes flooding.

Legend

In ancient literature, Tirupati is mentioned as Aadhi Varaha Kshetra. The Puranas associate the site with Lord Varaha, one of the Dashavatara of Lord Vishnu. In Varaha Purana, Venkatadri is believed to be a part of Mount Meru, which was brought on to the earth from Vishnu's abode Vaikuntam by his mount Garuda. The seven peaks represent the seven heads of Adisesha.

Demographics
 India census, Tirumala has a population of 7,741. Males constitute 52 percent of the population and females 48 percent. Tirumala has an average literacy rate of 72.8 percent, higher than the national average of 59.5 percent. The male literacy rate is 57.1 percent and the female rate is 42.9 percent. In Tirumala, 11 percent of the population is under six years of age.
Telugu is the major language. Hinduism is the only religion in Tirumala.

Culture

The town of Tirumala is strictly vegetarian. Consumption of non-vegetarian food, alcohol, and tobacco products is strictly prohibited in Tirumala, and smuggling any of these is considered a serious offence at Tirumala. Dhotis and Sarees are the traditional popular attire. The practices of tonsure and using tilaka are popular among devotees of Lord Venkateswara.

Festivals

Sri Venkateswara Brahmotsavams celebrated every year during September/October is the most important festival in Tirumala when it receives lakhs of devotees over a short span of a nine days. The city celebrates all major Hindu festivals including Sankranti, Ugadi etc. Vaikunta Ekadasi, the day on which it is believed that Vaikunta Dwarams will be opened, is celebrated in Tirumala. Rathasapthami is another festival, celebrated during February, when Lord Venkateswara processional deity, (Malayappa) is taken in a procession around the temple on seven different vahanas from early morning to late night.

Cuisine

Tirupati is known for world-famous Tirupati Laddu. It is the prasadam at Venkateswara Temple, Tirumala. Tirupati Laddu had got Geographical indication tag which entitles only Tirumala Tirupati Devasthanams to make or sell it.

Arts, crafts and architecture

Tirumala Tirupati Devasthanams established Sri Venkateswara Museum, one at Tirumala and the other at Tirupati. It has a wonderful collection of Tirupati temple architecture and historical artefacts, such as ancient weaponry, pooja items and idols. It has a comprehensive photo gallery that gives a unique insight into the Tirupati region's culture and traditions. It also boasts a meditation centre.

Landmarks

Venkateswara Temple is an abode of Lord Venkateswara situated in Tirumala. It is also known as Tirumala Temple. Srivaari Paadamulu (the footprints of Lord) are believed to be the footprints of Lord Venkateswara formed when he first stood on Tirumala Hills. Papavinasanam is a waterfall flowing from a tributary of the Swarnamukhi River. It also has a temple where seven lion-headed channels open from a height for deities to bathe below them. A temple dedicated to goddess Ganga is located near the enclosure. Akaasa Ganga is another natural waterfall in Tirumala.

Transport

Foot Steps

There are two paths to travel on foot from Tirupati to Tirumala. These paths are called Sopanamargas. The Devotees to fulfil their Vow to Lord Venkateswara will take this path to reach Tirumala on foot from Tirupati. Both the paths are completely roofed and passes through seven hills which are part of Seshachalam Hills.

 Alipiri Mettu – The first and Ancient path starts from Alipiri and consists of a total 3550 Steps which makes a distance of 11 km. At Alipiri there is a temple dedicated to Lord Venkateswara called Padalamandapam. There are Four Gopurams(Temple Towers) on the way.
This trail has 2388 steps and is shorter than Alipiri Metlu path.

Road

Tirumala can be accessed by road from Alipiri. There are two roads from Alipiri to Tirumala, one each dedicated to up and down traffic. The state government-owned Andhra Pradesh State Road Transport Corporation (APSRTC) operates frequent Saptagiri and Saptagiri Express buses from Tirupati and Alipiri and also from nearby places. Tirumala Tirupati Devasthanams (TTD) runs free buses for transit within Tirumala.

Rail

Tirupati Main railway station is one of the major railway station in the South Central Railway zone of the Indian Railways, providing rail connectivity to major parts of India.

Airport

It is a domestic and International airport with direct flights to Hyderabad, Visakhapatnam and New Delhi.

See also 
Hindu Temples in Tirupati
Tirumala Tirupati Devasthanams
Tirupati district

References

External links 

 Most Visited Holy Place in the World – World Record
Vasista ashramam, Srinivasa Mangapuram, Tirupati Website

Articles containing potentially dated statements from 2004
All articles containing potentially dated statements
Tirupati
Towns in Tirupati district
Hindu holy cities
Hills of Andhra Pradesh
Tourist attractions in Andhra Pradesh
Geography of Tirupati district
Mountains of Andhra Pradesh
Vegetarian towns in India